St. George's Bay - informally referred to as Bay St. George due to its French translation Baie St-George - is a large bay in the province of Newfoundland and Labrador, Canada.  It is located on the west coast of the island of Newfoundland and comprises a sub-basin of the Gulf of St. Lawrence.

Communities along the shoreline of St. George's Bay include (from northwest to east to southwest):

 Cape St. George
 Petit Jardin
 Grand Jardin
 De Grau
 Red Brook
 Loretto
 Marches Point
 Sheaves Cove
 Lower Cove
 Ship Cove
 Jerrys Nose
 Abraham's Cove
 Campbells Creek
 Man of War Cove
 Felix Cove
 Aguathuna
 Bellmans Cove
 Port au Port
 Port au Port East
 Romaines
 Kippens
 Stephenville
 Stephenville Crossing
 Mattis Point
 Barachois Brook
 Seal Rocks
 St. George's
 Sandy Point
 Shallop Cove
 Flat Bay
 Flat Bay West
 St. Teresa
 Journois
 Fischells
 Heatherton
 Robinsons
 McKay's
 Jeffrey's
 Bay St. George South
 St. David's
 Maidstone
 St. Fintan's
 Loch Leven
 Highlands
 Cape Anguille

See also
 Isthmus Bay, a sub-bay along the northern edge
 List of communities in Newfoundland and Labrador

References

 Natural Resources Canada (1984).  Cape St. George, Newfoundland and Labrador [map]. 1:50,000 NAD27. National Topographic System.
 Natural Resources Canada (1984).  Mainland, Newfoundland and Labrador [map]. 1:50,000 NAD27. National Topographic System.
 Natural Resources Canada (1984).  Flat Bay, Newfoundland and Labrador [map]. 1:50,000 NAD27. National Topographic System.
 Natural Resources Canada (1984).  Stephenville, Newfoundland and Labrador [map]. 1:50,000 NAD27. National Topographic System.
 Natural Resources Canada (1984).  Main Gut, Newfoundland and Labrador [map]. 1:50,000 NAD27. National Topographic System.
 Natural Resources Canada (1984).  Harrys River, Newfoundland and Labrador [map]. 1:50,000 NAD27. National Topographic System.
 Natural Resources Canada (1984).  St. Fintan's, Newfoundland and Labrador [map]. 1:50,000 NAD27. National Topographic System.
 Natural Resources Canada (1984).  Little Friars Cove, Newfoundland and Labrador [map]. 1:50,000 NAD27. National Topographic System.
 Natural Resources Canada (1984).  Codroy, Newfoundland and Labrador [map]. 1:50,000 NAD27. National Topographic System.

Bays of Newfoundland and Labrador